Anna Carroll may refer to:

 Anna Lee Carroll (1930–2017), American actress
 Anna Ella Carroll (1815–1894), American politician, pamphleteer and lobbyist

See also
 Anne Carroll (born 1940), British actress and director